Drymaeus eurystomus is a species of  tropical air-breathing land snail, a pulmonate gastropod mollusk in the family Bulimulidae.

Fulton (1905) was the first to realize that Bulimus eurystomus Philippi, 1867 and Bulimus hamadryas Philippi, 1867 are synonyms and only differ in colour pattern.

Distribution 

 Peru

References
This article incorporates CC-BY-3.0 text from the reference 

Drymaeus
Gastropods described in 1867